Waters's gerbil (Gerbillus watersi) is distributed mainly in Sudan, Somalia, and Djibouti.

References

Musser, G. G. and M. D. Carleton. 2005. Superfamily Muroidea. pp. 894–1531 in Mammal Species of the World a Taxonomic and Geographic Reference. D. E. Wilson and D. M. Reeder eds. Johns Hopkins University Press, Baltimore.
  Database entry includes a brief justification of why this species is of least concern
  Database entry includes a brief justification of why this species is of least concern

Gerbillus
Rodents of Africa
Mammals described in 1901
Taxa named by William Edward de Winton